The N19 road is a national primary road in Ireland, connecting from the N18 Limerick–Ennis–Galway road to Shannon Airport. It forms part of European route E20.

The route in its current form consists mostly of a dual-carriageway passing around Shannon Town, which starts at an interchange near Hurlers Cross on the N18 road. The dual-carriageway ends on the far side of Shannon Town at the Shannon Free Zone industrial estate, and proceeds as a two lane road to the airport.

Prior to the opening of this new dual-carriageway route in 2004, the route ran along a two-lane road through Shannon town centre itself. A junction without flyovers connected to what was then the end of the dual-carriageway section of the N18 (the dual-carriageway on that route now continues to Galway as a motorway as of September 2017).

Shannon Town can still be accessed from the N18 by use of the remaining portions of this road (connecting only as a slip road from the Limerick direction), as well as a new local link road from a new interchange at Hurler's Cross. The N19 no longer serves Shannon Town for most purposes, apart from the industrial estate.

See also
Roads in Ireland 
Motorways in Ireland
National secondary road
Regional road

References
Roads Act 1993 (Classification of National Roads) Order 2006 – Department of Transport

19
Roads in County Clare